The Fish Slough Area of Critical Environmental Concern is a protected slough in Inyo County, eastern California.

Its  were designated as an Area of Critical Environmental Concern (ACEC) in 1982, and is managed by the Bureau of Land Management. The Fish Slough Area is an oasis in the middle of the otherwise arid volcanic tableland. In 1975, Fish Slough was designated as a National Natural Landmark by the National Park Service.

Plants and biomes
The Fish Slough ACEC is located in the transition zone (ecotone) between the Mojave Desert and Great Basin biomes. Plant communities including wetlands, alkali meadows, and uplands.

One plant, Fish Slough milk vetch (Astragalus lentiginosus var. piscinensis), is endemic to the area.  The Alkali Mariposa lily (Calochortus striatus) is also a rare plant found in the ACEC, and is a vulnerable species on the California Native Plant Society Inventory of Rare and Endangered Plants.

See also

National Landscape Conservation System

References

External links
  Bureau of Land Management (BLM), Bishop Field Office: official Fish Slough Area of Critical Concernwebsite  
  BLM: Fish Slough Watchable Wildlife

Protected areas of Inyo County, California
Owens Valley
Ecology of the Great Basin
Natural history of the Mojave Desert
Natural history of Inyo County, California
Protected areas of the Mojave Desert
Protected areas established in 1982
1982 establishments in California
Bureau of Land Management areas in California
National Natural Landmarks in California